Busan Arts College provides training in a range of fine and applied arts.  The campus is located in the Nam-gu district of Busan metropolitan city, in southeastern South Korea.  Under government regulations, the school has a maximum enrollment of 790, of whom 700 may be enrolled in the day program and 90 in weekend classes.

As of the reorganization of 2003, the college includes fifteen academic departments:  applied music, music, theatre, practical dance, film and video, beauty art, modelling, sports and leisure studies, interior design, advertisement design, cartoon and animation, fine art, event producing, performing arts management, and creative writing.

History

The college received permission to open as a college with a maximum enrollment of 480 in 1993, and accepted its first students in spring 1994.  The Wongok Educational Foundation, which established it, had been in operation since 1978.   The school's art gallery opened in 1999.  The current dean, Kim Gi-deok, was installed in 2003.

Notable people
Kim Kwang-kyu, actor
Park Jimin, member of BTS
Kang Seung Yoon, WiNNER member
Yoon Dowoon, member of DAY6

See also
List of colleges and universities in South Korea
Education in South Korea

External links
Official school website, in Korean

Universities and colleges in Busan
Educational institutions established in 1993
1993 establishments in South Korea